is a Japanese politician and a member of the Liberal Democratic Party. He has been a member of the House of Representatives since 1983 and represents Ibaraki's 2nd district. He was Minister of Finance from 2007 to 2008.

Career

Nukaga was born in Asō, Ibaraki, now part of Namegata, Ibaraki. He graduated from Waseda University's Faculty of Political Science and Economics. He was named Minister of State and Director General of the Japan Defense Agency on 30 July 1998, under Prime Minister Keizō Obuchi, serving in that position until November 1998, when he resigned due to a scandal. He was named Minister of State in charge of economic and fiscal policy, as well as IT policy, on 5 December 2000, as part of Prime Minister Yoshirō Mori's second cabinet, but he resigned on 23 January 2001, following criticism regarding 15 million yen he had received from the mutual aid foundation KSD. He said that his secretary had received the money and that it had been returned, but apologized and said that he took "final responsibility as a supervisor".

Chief Cabinet Secretary Yasuo Fukuda said that the government believed Nukaga's explanation. Nukaga returned to the position of Minister of State and Director General of the Japan Defense Agency on 31 October 2005, under Prime Minister Junichiro Koizumi, and remained in that position until September 2006.

He was appointed Minister of Finance by Prime Minister Shinzō Abe in a cabinet reshuffle on 27 August 2007. Following Abe's resignation on 12 September, Nukaga initially said that he would run for the position of LDP president (and thus Prime Minister) on 13 September, but, on 14 September, after meeting with Yasuo Fukuda, Nukaga announced that he would back Fukuda for the leadership. Following Fukuda's victory in the leadership election, Nukuga remained as Finance Minister in Fukuda's Cabinet, sworn in on 26 September 2007. He was replaced in that post by Bunmei Ibuki on 1 August 2008. Nukaga is affiliated to the openly revisionist lobby Nippon Kaigi, that advocates a revision of the Constitution to restore the monarchy and militarism.

On 8 February 2018, Nukaga announced his intent to resign from his position as head of Heisei Kenkyūkai, the third largest faction in the LDP. Faction members had been unhappy with his performance as leader, namely his loyalty to Prime Minister Abe, and a rebellion had been brewing in the form of an exit of several Upper House members. He is to be replaced by Wataru Takeshita, half-brother of former Prime Minister Noboru Takeshita - the latter of whom founded the faction in the first place.

References

|-

|-

|-

|-

|-

|-

|-

|-

|-

|-

|-

1944 births
Living people
Waseda University alumni
Government ministers of Japan
Liberal Democratic Party (Japan) politicians
Members of the House of Representatives (Japan)
Ministers of Finance of Japan
Members of Nippon Kaigi
Japanese defense ministers
Politicians from Ibaraki Prefecture
21st-century Japanese politicians